Ali Latifi(born February 20, 1976) is a retired Iranian football (soccer) player. He was a member of the Iran national football team in the 1998 World Cup.

Club career Esteghlal
Latifi has played for several clubs in Iran, namely Bahman, PAS Tehran, Esteghlal, Aboumoslem. He also played for Admira Wacker in the 2001–02 season, and appeared for the club five times without scoring any goals.

International career 
He was a member of Iran national football team and participated at 1998 FIFA World Cup.

Honours

Player career

Managerial career

References 

  Interview by Abrar Varzeshi

Iranian footballers
Iran international footballers
Association football forwards
1998 FIFA World Cup players
Pas players
FC Admira Wacker Mödling players
Esteghlal F.C. players
F.C. Aboomoslem players
Iranian expatriate footballers
1976 births
Living people
Expatriate footballers in Austria
Bahman players